The Cliffs Valley is a resort community and census-designated place (CDP) in Greenville County, South Carolina, United States. It was first listed as a CDP prior to the 2020 census with a population of 736.

The CDP is on the northern edge of Greenville County, extending north to the North Carolina border. U.S. Route 25 forms the western edge of the CDP; the highway leads south  to Greenville and north  to Hendersonville, North Carolina.

The community is in the Blue Ridge Mountains and its foothills.  Panther Mountain and  Corbin Mountain are on the northern border of the CDP, separated by Panther Gap.  Pruett Mountain extends south into the middle of the CDP. The community is drained by Terry Creek, which flows south to the North Saluda River just outside the CDP.

The CDP is home to The Cliffs Valley Golf Course.

Demographics

2020 census

Note: the US Census treats Hispanic/Latino as an ethnic category. This table excludes Latinos from the racial categories and assigns them to a separate category. Hispanics/Latinos can be of any race.

References 

Census-designated places in Greenville County, South Carolina
Census-designated places in South Carolina